The 1895 college football season was the season of American football played among colleges and universities in the United States during the 1895–96 academic year. 

The 1895 Penn Quakers football team, led by head coach George Washington Woodruff, compiled a perfect 14–0 record and is recognized as the 1895 national champion by the Billingsley Report, Helms Athletic Foundation, Houlgate System, and National Championship Foundation. One selector, Parke H. Davis, recognized both Penn and Yale as co-national champions. Yale compiled a 13–0–2 record.

In the Midwest, Michigan led the way with an 8–1 record, the only loss coming in a road game against Harvard. In the South, the Southern Intercollegiate Athletic Association played its first year of college football with Vanderbilt winning the first conference championship.

Ten of the eleven players selected by Walter Camp and Caspar Whitney to the 1895 All-America college football team came from Penn, Yale, Harvard, and Princeton.  The eleventh player was quarterback Clint Wyckoff from Cornell. Six of the honorees have been inducted into the College Football Hall of Fame: Wyckoff, halfbacks Sam Thorne (Yale) and George H. Brooke(Penn), fullback Charley Brewer (Harvard), end Charles Gelbert (Penn), tackle Langdon Lea (Princeton), and guard Charles Wharton (Penn).

Conference and program changes
The Southern Intercollegiate Athletic Association began its first season of play in 1895.

Conference standings

Conference standings

Independents

Minor conferences

See also
 1895 College Football All-America Team

References